J and B v Director-General, Department of Home Affairs and Others is a 2003 decision of the Constitutional Court of South Africa which dealt with the situation of children born via artificial insemination to a lesbian couple in a permanent life-partnership. The court ruled that the partner who was not the biological parent was to be regarded as a natural parent and guardian and that the children were legitimate in law, and ordered the Department of Home Affairs to register both partners as parents on the children's birth certificates.

References

External links
 Text of the judgment

Constitutional Court of South Africa cases
2003 in LGBT history
2003 in case law
2003 in South African law
South African family case law
South African same-sex union case law